Takemoto (written: , ,  or ) is a Japanese surname. Notable people with the surname include:

, Japanese voice actor
, Japanese playwright and puppet theatre director
Iwao Takamoto (1925–2007), American animator, television producer, and film director
, Japanese manga artist
, Japanese footballer and manager
, Japanese artistic gymnast
, Japanese politician
, Japanese author and fashion designer
Tina Takemoto, American artist
, Japanese director of anime series
, Japanese footballer
, Japanese swimmer

Japanese-language surnames